Mounted Games is a branch of equestrian sport in which fast games are played on ponies up to a height of about .

They require athletic ability, riding skills, hand-to-eye coordination, determination, perseverance, and a competitive spirit, which nevertheless requires an ability to work together with other riders and a willingness to help one another.

Mounted Games were the inspiration of Prince Philip. When Col. Sir Mike Ansell was Director of the Horse of the Year Show, Prince Philip asked if he could devise a competition for children who could not afford an expensive, well-bred pony, and in 1957 the Horse of the Year Show, then at Harringay Arena in North London, England, staged the first Mounted Games Championship for the Prince Philip Cup—it was an immediate box office success.

The sport of Mounted Games as it exists today was founded by Norman Patrick. His aim was to extend the sport, previously age-restricted by Pony Club, for wider participation, and for this reason, in 1984, he established the Mounted Games Association of Great Britain. In the years which followed his continued support and patronage ensured that the sport spread across Great Britain and beyond.  At the time of his death in 2001, the sport which he had established was being enjoyed by many riders around the world, and the International Mounted Games Association, which was formed in 2003, now has members in 24 countries on 5 continents.

Games
There are many different games played in Mounted Games. These are split into team, pairs and individual games.

Participating nations
The member nations of the association are: Australia, Austria, Belgium, Canada, Czech Republic, Denmark, England, France, Germany, Ireland, Italy, Luxembourg, Mexico, New Zealand, Nigeria, Northern Ireland, Norway, Pakistan, Scotland, South Africa, Sweden, Switzerland, United States of America and Wales.

World Team Championships
The IMGA World Team Championships are held each year in a different member country. At the first World Championships in 1985 only four teams participated, by 2007 this had grown to 18 and is expected to continue rising over the coming years.

Originally Great Britain participated as one team however from 2000 onwards this was split into England, Scotland and Wales. Northern Ireland have always participated as a separate team.

References 

 
Equestrian team sports
Sports originating in the United Kingdom